Eupithecia subapicata is a moth in the family Geometridae first described by Achille Guenée in 1857. It is found in the western United States from California through Oregon to Washington.

The wingspan is about 22–26 mm. The forewings are wood brown. There is a small, light ocherous-brown, pre-apical, costal patch which is almost connected with an elongate, subapical patch of a similar color. The basal portion of the wing frequently shows shading of a lighter color which at times also occurs on the outer margin of the median band. The hindwings are pale smoky with indications of numerous crosslines, especially above the darker shaded inner margin. Adults have been recorded on wing from January to July.

References

Moths described in 1857
subapicata
Moths of North America